Frederick George Penny, 1st Viscount Marchwood  (10 March 1876 – 1 January 1955), was a British Conservative Party politician.

Background and education
The second son of Frederick James Penny, of Bitterne, Hampshire, and his wife Elizabeth Glover, a daughter of George Emerson Glover, the young Penny was educated at King Edward VI Grammar School, Southampton.

Career

Penny was a senior partner in Fraser & Co., Government brokers, of Singapore, and formerly Managing Director of Eastern Smelting Co. Ltd, Penang. He represented the Federated Malay States Government in negotiations with Netherlands Indies Government at Bandoeng, Java, regarding liquidation of war (1914–1918) tin stocks. 

He sat as Member of Parliament (MP) for Kingston-upon-Thames from 1922 until 1937 and served as Parliamentary Private Secretary to the Financial Secretary to the War Office in 1923, and as a Conservative Whip from 1926 to 1937, including as a Lord Commissioner of the Treasury from 1928 to 1929 and in 1931, as Vice-Chamberlain of the Household from 1931 to 1932, as Comptroller of the Household from 1932 to 1935 and as Treasurer of the Household from 1935 to 1937. From 1938 to 1946 he was Honorary Treasurer of the Conservative Party.

Penny was appointed a Freeman of the City of London, and an Officer (1st Class) of the Most Honourable Order of the Crown of Johor. He was Master of Honourable Company of Master Mariners from 1941 to 1945. He was knighted in 1929, created a Baronet, of Singapore and of Kingston-upon-Thames in the County of Surrey, in 1933, and raised to the peerage as Baron Marchwood, of Penang and of Marchwood in the County of Southampton, in 1937. 

He was appointed a Knight Commander of the Royal Victorian Order in 1937 and made Viscount Marchwood, of Penang and of Marchwood in the County of Southampton, in the 1945 Prime Minister's Resignation Honours.

Arms

References

External links 
 

|-

|-

1876 births
1955 deaths
Penny, Frederick
English justices of the peace
Knights Bachelor
Knights Commander of the Royal Victorian Order
People educated at King Edward VI School, Southampton
Penny, Frederick
Penny, Frederick
Penny, Frederick
Penny, Frederick
Penny, Frederick
Penny, Frederick
Penny, Frederick
Treasurers of the Household
Conservative Party (UK) hereditary peers
Barons created by George VI
Viscounts created by George VI